A ball-pen probe is a modified Langmuir probe used to measure the plasma potential in magnetized plasmas. The ball-pen probe balances the electron and ion saturation currents, so that its floating potential is equal to the plasma potential. Because electrons have a much smaller gyroradius than ions, a moving ceramic shield can be used to screen off an adjustable part of the electron current from the probe collector.

Ball-pen probes are used in plasma physics, notably in tokamaks such as CASTOR, (Czech Academy of Sciences Torus) ASDEX Upgrade, COMPASS, ISTTOK, MAST, TJ-K, RFX, H-1 Heliac, IR-T1, GOLEM as well as low temperature devices as DC cylindrical magnetron in Prague and linear magnetized plasma devices in Nancy and Ljubljana.

Principle
If a Langmuir probe (electrode) is inserted into a plasma, its potential is not equal to the plasma potential  because a Debye sheath forms, but instead to a floating potential . The difference with the plasma potential is given by the electron temperature :

where the coefficient  is given by the ratio of the electron and ion saturation current density ( and ) and collecting areas for electrons and ions ( and ):

The ball-pen probe modifies the collecting areas for electrons and ions in such a way that the ratio  is equal to one. Consequently,  and the floating potential of the ball-pen probe becomes equal to the plasma potential regardless of the electron temperature:

Design and calibration 

A ball-pen probe consists of a conically shaped collector (non-magnetic stainless steel, tungsten, copper, molybdenum), which is shielded by an insulating tube (boron nitride, Alumina). The collector is fully shielded and the whole probe head is placed perpendicular to magnetic field lines.

When the collector slides within the shield, the ratio  varies, and can be set to 1. The adequate retraction length strongly depends on the magnetic field's value. The collector retraction should be roughly below the ion's Larmor radius. Calibrating the proper position of the collector can be done in two different ways:

The ball-pen probe collector is biased by a low-frequency voltage that provides the I-V characteristics and obtain the saturation current of electrons and ions. The collector is then retracted until the I-V characteristics becomes symmetric. In this case, the ratio  is close to unity, though not exactly. If the probe is retracted deeper, the I-V characteristics remain symmetric.
The ball-pen probe collector potential is left floating, and the collector is retracted until its potential saturates. The resulting potential is above the Langmuir probe potential.

Electron temperature measurements 

Using two measurements of the plasma potential with probes whose coefficient  differ, it is possible to retrieve the electron temperature passively (without any input voltage or current). Using a Langmuir probe (with a non-negligible) and a ball-point probe (whose associated  is close to zero) the electron temperature is given by:
  

It can be calculated theoretically, its value being about 3 for a non-magnetized hydrogen plasma.

In practice, the ratio  for the ball-pen probe is not exactly equal to one, so that the coefficient  must be corrected by an empirical value for :

where

References

External links 
 PhD thesis, Jiri Adamek (Czech and English language)
 Overview: Ball-pen probe design, theory and first results at different fusion devices.
 Examination of plasma current spikes and general analysis of H-mode shots in the tokamak COMPASS
 Electrical Probe Measurements on the COMPASS Tokamak
 Probe Measurements on the COMPASS Tokamak
 Scanning ion sensitive probe for plasma profile measurements in the boundary of the Alcator C-Mod tokamak
 Development of Probes for Assessment of Ion Heat Transport and Sheath Heat Flux in the Boundary of the Alcator C-Mod Tokamak
 Video: Temporal evolution of Type-I ELM in the divertor region on the COMPASS tokamak.
 The new divertor Ball-pen and Langmuir probes on the COMPASS tokamak.

Plasma diagnostics